Mónika Kovács (born 15 March 1976) is a Hungarian alpine skier. She competed in four events at the 1998 Winter Olympics.

References

1976 births
Living people
Hungarian female alpine skiers
Olympic alpine skiers of Hungary
Alpine skiers at the 1998 Winter Olympics
Skiers from Budapest